Winter Offensive or variation may refer to:

 French Marshal General Turenne's Winter Campaign of 1674–75 against forces of the Holy Roman Empire during the Franco-Dutch War
 Winter operations 1914–1915 by the British Empire against Imperial Germany during World War I
 First Winter Campaign of 1919–20 between the Ukrainian People's Republic and Bolsheviks during the Ukrainian–Soviet War
 Second Winter Campaign of 1921 between the Ukrainian People's Army and Soviet Ukraine during the Ukrainian–Soviet War
 1939–40 Winter Offensive by the Republic of China against Imperial Japan and Mengjiang during the Second Sino-Japanese War
 The Winter War of 1939–40 between Finland and the Soviet Union
 Soviet Winter campaign of 1941–42 against Nazi Germany during World War II
 Winter Offensive of 1947 in Northeast China by the People's Liberation Army against the National Revolutionary Army during the Chinese Civil War
 Turkish army winter campaign of 1994–95 against the Kurdistan Workers' Party as part of the Kurdish–Turkish conflict